Filhol is a surname. Notable people with the surname include:

Alain Filhol (born 1951), French racing driver
Antoine Michel Filhol (1759-1812), French engraver
Édouard Filhol (1814–1883), French scientist
Élisabeth Filhol (born 1965), French writer
Henri Filhol (1843-1902), French medical doctor
Jean-Gilles Filhol de Camas (1758-1805), French Navy officer

See also
 Jean-Baptiste Filhiol, a Frenchman, called Don Juan Filhiol by the Spanish